The Argentina national cerebral palsy football team (nicknamed Los Tigres) is the national football team that represents Argentina in international competitions. The team is managed by the "Argentine Cerebral Palsy Football Federation"  (FAFPC).  Their best world ranking sixth and their lowest was ninth. Argentina has competed at both the IFCPF World Championships and the Paralympic Games, but has never finished in the medals in either event.

Overview 

In 2012, the team was coached by Osvaldo Hernández. In February 2014, an IFCPF coaching workshop was held in Brazil to try to further develop the sport.  Chilean, Brazilian and Argentine coaches participated in it.

National team development is supported by an International Federation of Cerebral Palsy Football (IFCPF) recognized national championship.  Recognized years for the national IFCPF recognized competition include  2010, 2011, 2012, 2013, 2014, and 2015.

In 2016, after getting an endorsement by the World AntiDoping Agency (WADA), the IFCPF Anti-Doping Code was formally amended to allow for out of competition testing.  This was done through a WADA approved Whereabouts Programme managed through ADAMS. Drawing from players in a  Registered Testing Pool, players from this country were included ahead of the 2016 Summer Paralympics in Rio.

Ranking 
Argentina was ranked sixth in the world by the IFCPF in 2016. The team is also ranked second in the Americas in 2016. In August 2013 and November 2014, Argentina was also ranked sixth  in the world. In September 2012, the team was ranked eighth. In September 2011, Argentina was ranked ninth.

Players 
There have been a number of players for the Argentine squad.

Results 
Argentina has participated in a number of international tournaments. Six teams participated in the Toronto hosted American Cup in 2014. Group A included Venezuela, Argentina and Canada.  Group B included Mexico, Brazil and the United States.  The tournament was important for preparations for the 2015 Parapan American Games, and because it was the last major continental level competition of the year.  The team participated in the 2015 Parapan American Games, where they came away with a silver medal.

IFCPF World Championships 
Argentina has participated in the IFCPF World Championships.

Paralympic Games 

Argentina has participated in 7-a-side football at the Paralympic Games.  They have never won a medal.

Paralympic Results

2016 Summer Paralympics

Argentina qualified for the Paralympics through the 2015 Parapan American Games in Toronto after Iran's qualifying spot was withdrawn because of a lack of competitors in their region.

The draw for the tournament was held on May 6 at the  2016 Pre Paralympic Tournament in Salou, Spain.  Argentina was put into Group B with the United States, Netherlands and Russia. Iran qualified for the 2016 Rio Games following the suspension of Russia.  The IPC ruled that there could not be a redraw for the groups.  This resulted in Iran being put into Group A with the Netherlands, Argentina and the United States. The tournament where the Paralympic draw took place featured 7 of the 8 teams participating in Rio.  It was the last major preparation event ahead of the Rio Games for all teams participating.  Argentina finished 7th after losing placement matches to the United States 4 - 3 and Ireland 0 - 3.

Going into the Rio Games, the team was hoping to build on good results earlier in past two years and win a medal.

References

External links

 
 Official website (archived)

Cerebral Palsy
Argentina at the Paralympics
National cerebral palsy football teams
Football 7-a-side teams at the 2016 Summer Paralympics
Football 7-a-side teams at the 2012 Summer Paralympics
Football 7-a-side teams at the 2004 Summer Paralympics
Football 7-a-side teams at the 2000 Summer Paralympics
Football 7-a-side teams at the 1996 Summer Paralympics